The World's Billionaires 2010 edition was 24th annual ranking of The World's Billionaires by Forbes magazine.  The list estimated the net worth of the world's richest people, excluding royalty and dictators, as of February 12, 2010.  It was released online on March 10, 2010.  Forty reporters across 13 countries contributed to the list.  Carlos Slim and Bill Gates were featured on the cover.

Annual list
Mexican telecommunication mogul Carlos Slim narrowly eclipsed Microsoft's Bill Gates to top the billionaire list for the first time.  Slim saw his estimated worth surge $18.5 billion to $53.5 billion as shares of America Movil rose 35%.  Gates' estimated wealth rose $13 billion to $53 billion, placing him second. Investor Warren Buffett was third with $47 billion, up form $37 billion.  Christy Walton was the highest ranking women, placing 12th overall, with an inherited fortune of $22.5 billion.  At age 25, Facebook founder Mark Zuckerberg was the world's youngest billionaire.  American Isaac Perlmutter was among the top newcomers with an estimated fortunate $4 billion acquired in his sale of Marvel Entertainment to Disney.

A total of 1,011 people made the 2010, up from 793 the year before, but short of the all-time record of 1,125.  The United States accounted for 403 billionaires, followed by China with 89 and Russia with 62.  It was the first time China, which includes Hong Kong, placed second. A total of 55 countries were represented on the 2010 list, including Finland and Pakistan which claimed their first billionaires. China, India, South Korea, and Turkey were among 11 countries that saw a doubling of the numbers billionaires.   Eighty-nine women made the list, but only 14 of them were self-made.  Of the 89, 12 were newcomers in 2010.  Half of those 14 self-made women came from China.  

Steve Forbes said the growing number of billionaires was clear sign that the world's economy was recovering from 2009's global financial crisis.  His magazine declared that Asia was leading the recovery, with the US lagging behind, based on the billionaire list.  The 2010 list featured 164 re-entries and 97 true newcomers.  Asia accounted for more than 100 of the new entrants.  Overall, just 12% of the list lost wealth since 2009, and 30 people fell off the list.  Thirteen others died. The combined net worth of the list was $3.6 trillion, up 50% from 2009's $2.4 trillion, while the average net worth was $3.5 billion. The United States accounted for 38% of the lists, down from 44% the year prior.

Top 10

Top 100

See also
 List of wealthiest families

References

External links
Forbes: The World's Billionaires 2010 (complete list)

2010 in economics
Forbes lists
Lists of people by magazine appearance